Public holidays in Iceland are established by the act of the Icelandic parliament. The public holidays are the religious holidays of the Church of Iceland and the First Day of Summer, May Day, the Icelandic National Day. In addition, Christmas Eve and New Year's Eve are holidays from 1PM.

There are also twelve official flag days in Iceland, some of which are not public holidays. On a flag day all government buildings fly the flag. Although citizens are not obliged to do it, most people do, if they have a flagpole.

Public holidays

Other days that are celebrated 
In addition to the public holidays, other special days are celebrated in Iceland, some of which are official flagdays as well.

References 

 
Iceland
Icelandic culture
Law of Iceland
Holidays